The women's 200 metres event at the 1983 Summer Universiade was held at the Commonwealth Stadium in Edmonton, Canada on 8, 9 and 10 July 1983.

Medalists

Results

Heats

Wind:Heat 1: -1.0 m/s Heat 2: ? m/s, Heat 3: +1.0 m/s

Semifinals

Wind:Heat 1: -0.9 m/s, Heat 2: ? m/s

Final

Wind: +0.6 m/s

References

Athletics at the 1983 Summer Universiade
1983